Barthel is an unincorporated community in northern Saskatchewan, Canada. It is a populated locality, an area similar to a locality but with a small group of dwellings or other buildings.

It is near the following areas: 
Horse Head (13.4 km)
Loon River (24.5 km)
Morin Creek (26.9 km)
Bright Sand (29.8 km)
Stowlea (30.6 km)
Whelan (33.3 km)
Glenbogie (34.5 km)
Blue Bell (36.9 km)
Little Fishing Lake (37.1 km)
Red Cross (37.9 km)
Elmhurst (39.9 km)
Kilronan (41.4 km)
Makwa (14 km)
Loon Lake (16.6 km)
St. Walburg (34.4 km)

Loon Lake No. 561, Saskatchewan
Unincorporated communities in Saskatchewan
Division No. 17, Saskatchewan